The Central Eurasian Studies Society (CESS) is a North American-based society for scholars concerned with the Central Eurasian region. The society seeks to "promote high standards of research and teaching, and to foster communication among scholars through meetings and social networking", and to "facilitate interaction among senior, established scholars, junior scholars, graduate students, and independent scholars in North America and throughout the world". Created in 2000, the society holds annual conferences and presents awards for recent publications.

History
Initial discussion about the creation of a society for Central Asian studies in North America began in the late 1990s during workshops at the University of Wisconsin–Madison. Eventually consensus was reached for the establishment of the Central Eurasian Studies Society, and the first annual conference was held in October 2000. In April 2001, CESS was incorporated as a non-profit corporation in Massachusetts. The organization grew rapidly, and by 2003 had over 1,500 members from 70 countries.

The Central Eurasian Studies Review, was the society's main publication first published in 2002, but is no longer published.  However, links to previous copies are archived on their website .

By 2003 the CESS Secretariat had been established at Harvard University's Program on Central Asia and the Caucasus. The secretariat would later becoming a rotating secretariat, moving to Miami University in 2007 and Indiana University in 2011 .

Activities
CESS has held an annual conference since 2000, usually in October. The conferences are held at various universities throughout Canada and the United States. The 2012 conference was held at Indiana University in Bloomington, Indiana

The society's first international conference (called a "regional conference") was held in August 2008 in Choktal, Kyrgyzstan.

Additionally, CESS presents two awards every year - a Book Award and a Best Graduate Student Paper Award. Each winner receives $500, and the best graduate student paper will be published in the academic journal Central Asian Survey.

Publications
The main publication of CESS is the Central Eurasian Studies Review, published bi-annually in the spring and summer. It was first published in January 2002. The publication is divided into four sections: Perspectives, Research Reports (for on-going research only), Conferences and Lecture Series, and Educational Resources and Developments. All current and past issues are available online.

References

External links
Central Eurasian Studies Society Website

Professional associations based in the United States
Central Asian studies
Educational organizations based in the United States